Believers is a studio album by American singer-songwriter Don McLean, released on October 29, 1981.

The album leads off with a re-recording of "Castles in the Air", a song which originally appeared on McLean's 1970 debut album Tapestry. Released as a single, it reached #7 on the Billboard Adult Contemporary chart and #36 on the Hot 100 chart.

Track listing
All tracks composed by Don McLean, except where indicated.

"Castles in the Air"
"Isn't It Strange"
"Left for Dead on the Road of Love"
"Believers"
"Sea Man"
"I Tune the World Out"
"Love Hurts" (Boudleaux Bryant)
"Jerusalem"
"Love Letters" (Edward Heyman, Victor Young)
"Crazy Eyes"
"Sea Cruise" (Huey "Piano" Smith)
"Dream Lover" (Bobby Darin)

Chart positions

Personnel
Don McLean - vocals, guitar
Ray Edenton, Billy Sanford, James Capps, Jerry Shook, Steve Chapman - guitars
Sheldon Kurland - strings
Dennis Solee - saxophone
Hargus "Pig" Robbins, David Briggs - piano
Bob Moore - bass guitar
Leon Rhodes - six-string bass guitar
Jerry Carrigan, Gene Chrisman - drums
Ronald Vaughan - percussion
The Jordanaires - backing vocals
Bill Justis - string arrangements
Larry Butler - producer

References

Don McLean albums
1981 albums
Albums arranged by Bill Justis
Albums produced by Larry Butler (producer)